Sarah Edney was selected first overall by the Brampton Thunder in the 2015 CWHL Draft. She made her debut with the Canada women's national ice hockey team at the 2015 4 Nations Cup in Sundsvall, Sweden.

Playing career
Edney played high school hockey at Our Lady of Mount Carmel in Mississauga, Ontario. While a student there, she also competed in softball and track and field. In her junior season, she was named an assistant captain in hockey. She also played hockey for the Mississauga Junior Chiefs. During her career with the Junior Chiefs, Edney led the squad to gold and silver medals in the Ontario provincial championships.

Hockey Canada
At the 2011 IIHF Women's Under 18 championships, she was the captain of Team Canada. She would help the team earn a silver medal. In the same year, she was the Team Ontario captain at the 2011 Canada Winter Games, where she claimed a silver medal.

She was a member of Canada's National Women's Development Team that won a gold medal at the 2015 Nations Cup (formerly known as the Meco Cup).

NCAA
Edney committed to join the Harvard Crimson of the ECAC.

NWHL
On August 31, 2017, Edney signed with the Buffalo Beauts as a free agent, joining former Thunder teammates Jess Jones and Rebecca Vint who also signed with the Beauts. Edney participated in the 3rd NWHL All-Star Game.

Career stats

Hockey Canada

Awards and honours
 Mississauga Female High School Athlete of the Year in 2010-11
 Our Lady of Mount Carmel High School Hockey Most Valuable Player (2009–10)
 Our Lady of Mount Carmel Junior Student Athlete of the Year
 Our Lady of Mount Carmel Senior Student Athlete of the Year
 Toronto Star High School Female Athlete of the Week (Week of January 12, 2010)

NWHL
NWHL Co-Player of the Week, Awarded March 12, 2018

References

Living people
Canadian women's ice hockey defencemen
Harvard Crimson women's ice hockey players
Ice hockey people from Ontario
Sportspeople from Mississauga
1993 births